In Aztec mythology, Cihuatecayotl (roughly pronounced 'see-wah-teh-kye-olth') is the god of the West wind. His brothers are Mictlanpachecatl, Tlalocayotl, and Huitztlampaehecatl, who personify the winds from the north, east, and south respectively.

See also 
Zephyrus

Favonius

Notes 

Aztec gods
Wind deities